Auja al-Hafir (also Auja), was an ancient road junction close to water wells in the western Negev and eastern Sinai. It was  the traditional grazing land of the 'Azazme tribe. Today it is the site of Nitzana and the Ktzi'ot military base in  the Southern District of Israel.

Etymology
Other sources name the locality el-Audja, 'Uja al-Hafeer, El Auja el Hafir and variations thereof.

A‘waj means "bent" in Arabic, and "Al-Auja" is a common name for meandering streams (the Yarkon River in Israel and a smaller stream near Jericho on the West Bank both are called Al-Auja in Arabic).

"Hafir" means a water reservoir built to catch runoff water at the base of a slope; in Sudan it can also mean a drainage ditch.

History

2nd century BCE to 7th century CE
Pottery remains found in the area date back to the 2nd century BC. and are associated with the traces of massive foundations of an unknown building probably of Nabatean construction. The area appears to have remained under the Nabatean sphere of influence, outwith the Hasmonaean and Herodian Kingdoms, until AD 105 when Trajan annexed the Nabataean Kingdom. A large rectangular hill-top fort probably dates from the 4th century AD. A church and associated buildings have been dated as having been built before AD 464. Auja al-Hafir was struck by the great plague which swept the Eastern Mediterranean around AD 541. During the 1930s a large number of papyri, dating from the 6th and 7th century, were found. One of which is from the local Arab governor granting Christian inhabitants freedom of worship on payment of the appropriate tax. After 700 AD the town appears to have lost its settled population, possibly due to changing rainfall patterns.

Late Ottoman period

'Auja al-Hafir lay in a tract of 604 dunams privately owned by the Turkish sultan Abdul Hamid II. After the establishment of Beersheba as the main regional center, the governor of Jerusalem Ekram Bey planned for a new city at al-Hafir, 10km to the west of 'Auja, but decided to establish it instead at 'Auja and give it the combined name of 'Auja al-Hafir. A new Kaza was established there. A barracks, inn and a government office were built, and a police station was raised in 1902. From 1905 to 1915 the Ottoman authorities built a railroad, as well as a large administrative centre complete with an apartment building for the clerks.

However, the town didn't develop until it became an outpost on the Egyptian front during World War I. In mid-January, 1915, a Turkish Army force of 20,000 entered Sinai by way of El-Auja on an unsuccessful expedition against the Suez Canal. At this time most of the dressed stone was taken from the ancient buildings for building work in Gaza.

British Mandate

According to the 1931 census  Auja al-Hafir had a population of 29 inhabitants, all Muslims, living in 9 houses, in addition to 35 people living at the police post. 

The local population were not involved in the disturbances of 1929 and 1936 but there was some disorder in the summer of 1938.

At the start of the 1936 disturbances the British Mandate authorities used Auja as a prison camp for arrested Palestinian Arab leaders including Awny Abdul Hadi. It was also used to hold Jewish Communists who were being deported. The prisoners were later transferred to the army base at Sarafand.
The central route across the desert to the Suez Canal crossed from El Auja to Ismailia, until 1948 this was the only paved road between Palestine and Egypt. During the British Mandate of Palestine it was part of the District of Beersheba.

An elementary school was established by the Mandate Government, but closed in 1932 due to insufficient and irregular attendance.  It was reopened in 1945 at tribal expense and had 23 pupils.

In 1947, 'Auja al-Hafir was granted an official Town Planning Scheme. 

According to the United Nations Partition Plan for Palestine, the area was designated as  part of the Arab state.

1948 Arab–Israeli War

In 1948 the Egyptian Army used the area as a military base. In the Battle of 'Auja, a campaign of the 1948 Arab–Israeli War, it was captured  by the 89th Mechanized Commando Battalion of Israel, which had an English-speaking platoon of volunteers from England, Germany, the Netherlands, Rhodesia, South Africa, and the U.S.

Israel

As a result of the 1949 Armistice Agreements, the area around the village, known as the al-Auja Zone, became a 145 km2 demilitarized zone (DMZ), with compliance monitored by the United Nations Truce Supervision Organization (UNTSO). On 28 September 1953 the Israeli army established a fortified settlement, Ktzi'ot, overlooking the al-Auja junction. The first name given to this Nahal outpost was Giv'at Ruth -named after the nearby Tell-abu-Rutha. Despite a recent request for compliance with the armistice and over the objections of UNTSO Chief of Staff Burns and UN Secretary General Hammarskjöld, Israel re-militarized the area on September 21, 1955. Israel continued to occupy the area until after its withdrawal from Sinai and Gaza, which ended the 1956 Suez Crisis. After this, and until the Six-Day War, the DMZ and the border were monitored by the United Nations Emergency Force. Israel has controlled the area since 1967 where it has a large military base and detention camp.

See also 
 Nitzana Border Crossing
 Battles of Bir 'Asluj
 Nitzana (Nabataean city)

 Operation Volcano

References

Bibliography

 Israel Unit in Neutral Zone, Strategic Village Occupied, The Times, September 21, 1955, page 8.

 Ending Strife in Auja Zone, Egypt Accepts U.N. Plan, Mr. Hammarskjöld's Statement, The Times, January 25, 1956, page 8.

External links
Welcome To 'Awja Hafir PS,
  Uja al Hafeer, Zochrot
 Nitzana (Auja El-Hafir) Memorial Board For The 1948 Independence War Fighters In The Negev
 P. Colt. No. 60 - A Bilingual Entagion From The Year 54 AH / 674 CE
 Australian War Memorial AWM Collection Record: P02041.015
 Australian War Memorial AWM Collection Record: P02041.008
 Detailed map of 1953 with Al Āwja Neutral Zone

Geography of Palestine (region)
History of Palestine (region)
Geography of Israel